Mark H. Lawrence is an American classical musician and academic who was the principal trombonist of the San Francisco Symphony Orchestra from 1974 to 2007.

Education 
Lawrence was educated at the University of Michigan and the Curtis Institute of Music.

Career 
Lawrence is an active soloist, clinician, chamber musician, and teacher. He has performed at the International Brass Conference, the International Trombone Association Conference, and is a frequent recitalist in the United States and abroad. He has been featured as a soloist with the San Francisco Symphony Orchestra on several occasions, and has been guest artist with many other orchestras as well. He is a founding member of Summit Brass, an ensemble composed of outstanding brass players from across America. In addition he is a frequent performer with Chicago's Music of the Baroque. 

He has taught at the San Francisco Conservatory of Music, the Colburn School and the Rafael Mendez Brass Institute. He has been on the faculty of Boston University, the Tanglewood Institute, and the Music Academy of the West, and has given master classes worldwide.  Many of his former students have gone on to successful orchestral careers in the U.S. and in Europe.

References

Year of birth missing (living people)
Living people
American trombonists
Male trombonists
University of Michigan alumni
Curtis Institute of Music alumni
21st-century trombonists
21st-century American male musicians
Summit Records artists